Zhan Bingyan (November 1928 – 4 September 2022) was a Chinese urologist and politician. A member of the Communist Party, he served on the National People's Congress from 1993 to 1998.

Zhan died in Wuhan on 4 September 2022 at the age of 93.

References

1928 births
2022 deaths
Chinese urologists
Chinese Communist Party politicians from Hubei
Delegates to the 8th National People's Congress